Obinna Nwachukwu (born 18 January 1992) is a Nigerian international footballer who plays for Heartland, as a midfielder.

Career
Nwachukwu has played club football for Heartland.

He made his international debut for Nigeria in 2012.

References

1992 births
Living people
Nigerian footballers
Nigeria international footballers
Association football midfielders